Schäftlarn is a municipality in the district of Munich in Bavaria in Germany. It consists of the villages Ebenhausen, Hohenschäftlarn, Kloster Schäftlarn, Neufahrn and Zell. The river Isar runs through it. A human settlement with the name "Schäftlarn" does not exist.

The most famous building complex is Schäftlarn Abbey (Kloster).

History 
The name Schäftlarn was officially recorded as a municipality in 1873. But the roots of the place go back much farther. Schäftlarn Abbey was founded in the year 762 as a monastery for Benedictine monks. The village of Hohenschäftlarn is first mentioned in documents 778 and belonged to the abbey. The monastery was rebuilt between 1702 and 1760, and the church of St. Georg in the village of Hohenschäftlarn in 1729/30. During the secularisation of Bavaria in 1803 the monastery was dissolved. In 1818 the municipality of Schäftlarn was first established as an independent political entity. In 1866 Ludwig I of Bavaria re-established the monastery and gave it back to the Benedictines, who founded a school there. The village of Zell is first mentioned in documents in the year 1160, but it also probably is much older. The first documents about Ebenhausen date back to the year 1130, when it was called Emmenhusen. Neufahrn is first mentioned in 1140.

Transport 
The municipality has a railway station, on the Isar Valley Railway.

References

Munich (district)